Mehri or Mahri ( مهريّت ) is the most spoken of the Modern South Arabian languages (MSALs), a subgroup of the Semitic branch of the Afroasiatic family. It is spoken by the Mehri tribes, who inhabit isolated areas of the eastern part of Yemen, western Oman, particularly the Al Mahrah Governorate, with a small number in Saudi Arabia near the Yemeni and Omani borders. Up to the 19th century, speakers lived as far north as the central part of Oman.

Mehri and its sister MSALs were spoken in the southern Arabian Peninsula before the spread of Arabic along with Islam in the 7th century CE. Today it is also spoken by Mehri residents in Qatar and the United Arab Emirates, as well as in Kuwait by guest workers originally from South Arabia, as well as nationals with a South Arabian heritage.

Given the dominance of Arabic in the region over the past 1400 years and the frequent bilingualism with Arabic among Mehri speakers, Mehri is at some risk of extinction. It is primarily a spoken language, with little existing vernacular literature and almost no literacy in written Mehri among native speakers.

Dialects 
Abu Muhammad al-Hasan al-Hamdani noted that "the Mahra speak a barbarous tongue like foreigners". Elsewhere, Hamdani showed extensive knowledge of Arabian dialects, each of which was rated in its distance from classical Arabic. 

Today, Mehri exists in two main dialects, Yemeni Mehri (also known as Southern Mehri) and Omani Mehri (also known as Dhofari Mehri and Nagd Mehri). Omani Mehri is spoken by a smaller population and shows no significant variation within itself, but Yemeni Mehri is further divided into western and eastern dialects.

Phonology 
Unlike other Modern South Arabian languages (MSALs), Mehri 'emphatic' consonants are not simply ejectives. They may also be pharyngealized, as in Arabic, so it is possible for Mehri to attest to a transition from proto-Semitic ejective consonants to the pharyngealized emphatics that are found in many Semitic languages.

The consonant inventory is as follows:

/ɡ/ can be realized as an affricate [dʒ] or palatal plosive [ɟ] in the Yemeni dialect.

The vowel inventory is as follows:

Voiced obstruents, or at least voiced stops, devoice in pausa. In this position, both the voiced and emphatic stops are ejective, losing the three-way contrast ( is ejective in all positions). Elsewhere, the emphatic and (optionally) the voiced stops are pharyngealized. Emphatic (but not voiced) fricatives have a similar pattern, and in non-pre-pausal position they are partially voiced.

The difference in place of the laterals is not clear. It may be that the approximant is denti-alveolar, like the alveolar occlusives, and the lateral fricatives apical, or it may be that the latter are palato-alveolar or alveolo-palatal. The fricatives are typically transcribed ś, etc.

 is only in Arabic loans. It is not clear if the rhotic is a trill or a tap.

Morphology 
The following are the personal pronouns of Mehri:

The following are the possessive suffix versions of those pronouns:

The independent pronouns can also be placed after the genitive exponent (ð-) to convert them into possessive pronouns ("mine" etc).

Writing system 

Mehri, like other Modern South Arabian languages, possesses a rich oral tradition, but not a written one. There exist two main approaches to writing the language: using the standard Arabic alphabet or using a modified Arabic alphabet that contains additional letters to represent sounds unique to Mehri.

The most common approach is using the unmodified Arabic alphabet. However, standard Arabic’s deficiencies with respect to MSAL result in this approach representing multiple phonemes with the same letters. (Note that, in both Arabic and modified Arabic systems, the vowels are not explicitly differentiated, but are differentiated by the readers through context.)

The modified Arabic alphabet has a few systems, none of which is standardized. The most commonly used modified Arabic additional letters as documented in use (e.g., in text messages, email, etc.) by the MSAL centre at the University of Leeds; a proposed set of additional letters for the Arabic alphabet to adapt it to be able to be a good systemic for writing MSAL languages (including Mehri) by that same centre; and a separate set of additional letters proposed by Almahrah.net for the same purpose are given (along with IPA phonetic transcription and Romanizations) in the columns of the table below.

See also 
 Soqotri language
 Shehri language

Notes

Further reading 
 Rubin, Aaron. 2010. The Mehri Language of Oman. Leiden: Brill.

 Rubin, Aaron, 2018. Omani Mehri: A New Grammar with Texts. Leiden: Brill.

External links 
  Examples of Mehri poetry from Hadramut forum
 ELAR archive of Mehri language documentation materials
 The Mehri language in south Yemen, Al Jazeera Channel (YouTube video, in Arabic and Mehri)

Languages of Oman
Languages of Yemen
Languages of Somalia
Languages of Kuwait
Languages of Qatar
Modern South Arabian languages